The men's 110 metres hurdles at the 2013 World Championships in Athletics was held at the Luzhniki Stadium on 11 and 12 August.

Records
Prior to the competition, the records were as follows:

Qualification standards

Schedule

Results

Heats
Heats were held on 11 August.

Wind:Heat 1: +0.5 m/, Heat 2: -0.3 m/, Heat 3: +0.5 m/, Heat 4: -0.6 m/

Qualification: First 3 in each heat (Q) and the next 3 fastest (q) advanced to the semifinals.

Semifinals
Qualification: First 3 in each heat (Q) and the next 2 fastest (q) advanced to the final.

Wind: Heat 1: −0.3 m/s, Heat 2: −0.3 m/s.

Final
Wind: +0.3 m/s.

References

External links
110 metres hurdles results at IAAF website

Hurdles 110
Sprint hurdles at the World Athletics Championships